Gloška planina (Serbian Cyrillic: Глошка  планина) is a mountain in southeastern Serbia, near the town of Bosilegrad.

References

External links
 Photo tour on Gloška planina

Mountains of Serbia